Krenar Alimehmeti (born 17 August 1966) is an Albanian retired football player and current manager. Many fans know him as Krenar Zhubi.

Playing career

Club
As a player, he represented KF Tirana formerly known as 17 Nëntori Tirana with whom he won 6 league titles.

International
He also represented the Albania National Team in 1988 in a World Cup Qualifier against Poland. He started that game and played the full 90 minutes but never featured for Albania again.

Managerial career
He was named the coach of KS Elbasani before the start of the 2007–2008 season, he left the club after one season. In 2011, Alimehmeti was named deputy chairman of the board of directors at Tirana.

Political career
In 2013, Alimehmeti was second on the Party for Justice, Integration and Unity list in Tirana for the General Parliamentary Elections.

Honours
Kategoria Superiore (6): 1988, 1989, 1996, 1997, 1999, 2000

References

External links

1966 births
Living people
Association football midfielders
Albanian footballers
Albania international footballers
KF Tirana players
Albanian football managers
KF Tirana managers
KF Elbasani managers
Kategoria Superiore players
Kategoria Superiore managers